Orsara di Puglia is a small town and comune in the province of Foggia, Apulia, southern Italy.
 
Named as Orsara Dauno-Irpina between 1861 and 1884, the town was part of the province of Avellino until 1927.

History 
The origins of Orsara date back to antiquity, as can be deduced from some archaeological findings that attest to the contacts with the Osci and the Irpini. In Roman times it was affected by the Second Punic War while the Via Traiana, a variant of the more ancient Via Appia, passed along the course of the Sannoro stream.

In the VIII century a community of Basilian monks settled there , dedicated to the cult of the archangel Michael, who was venerated in the cave that today takes his name. In the Middle Ages the town, named Castrum Ursariae, was equipped with walls, which protected it from foreign incursions. During Norman times, the court of Ripalonga were in defense of the Via Francigena. The knights of Calavera settled here during the mid 1200s and early 1300s.

Symbol 

The coat of arms of the Municipality of Orsara di Puglia was granted by decree of the President of the Republic on 8 March 2006.

Demographics

Dialect & Language 
Alongside the Italian language, the Dauno-Irpino dialect is also spoken in the commune.

Religion 
Like most of Italy, the commune is largely Catholic. However there has been a large Waldensian presence, perhaps from Occitan people and American immigrants since 1900. A Waldensian church in the Saint Nicola parish was opened in 1934.

Economy 
The economy is essentially based on agriculture, with crops of wheat, broad beans, maize and sunflowers; there are poultry, sheep and goat farms. In recent years, food and wine tourism has had a strong boost, sealed by the recognition as a Slow Food city in 2007.

Places of interest 

 Parish church of San Nicola, dating back to the 16th century: it preserves a wooden statue of the Madonna della Neve, made in 1624 by the Neapolitan sculptor Aniello Stellato.
 Church of Santa Maria della Neve, built in the 17th century on an older building
 Abbey of Sant'Angelo or dell'Annunziata, built between the 8th and 11th centuries in Byzantine style and originally the monastery of Santi Nicandro and Marciano
 Convent of San Domenico, from the 11th century
 Grotta di San Michele Arcangelo, a pilgrimage destination from the 8th century
 Fountain of the Angel
 Fontana Nuova, (16th century)
 Baronial Palace, from the 13th century, with a tower with arched single lancet windows. It hosted the knights of Calatrava and later the Guevara family, who were lords of Orsara.
 Torre Guevara, built in the second half of the seventeenth century by Duke Guevara di Bovino. In the early eighteenth century it was the hunting residence of Charles III of Bourbon.

Festivals 
The following are festivals celebrated in the town:

 8 May - anniversary of the apparition of St. Michael the Archangel;
 Penultimate Sunday of June - wine festival;
 Last week of July / Before August - High Specialization Jazz Festival and Seminars "Orsara Jazz Festival & Orsara Jazz Summer Camp" which has been held since 1990;
 5 August - feast of the Madonna della Neve;
 29 September - feast of St. Michael the Archangel;
 November 1st - fuoc acost and cocc 'priatorj  According to tradition, the souls of Purgatory return to earth on the evening of All Saints, therefore the people of Orsara decorate the streets of the town with pumpkins, which symbolize souls ( cocce priatorje ), and light bonfires of dry branches of broom (fuoc acost, from the Greek akostòi, scattered), to console them. The typical dessert, common to many southern towns (cooked wheat mixed with pomegranate grains and chopped walnuts and seasoned with vincotto) has the original name musc'tagl ''' , perhaps from the French mouche taille'' .

References

External links
 Official website

Cities and towns in Apulia